Major-General Richard Eyre Lloyd CB, CBE, DSO  (7 December 1906 – 10 April 1991) was a British Army officer who served as Director of Military Intelligence.

Military career
Lloyd was commissioned into the Royal Engineers. He served in the Second World War in North West Europe for which he was awarded the Distinguished Service Order.

After the War he became Assistant Chief of Staff, Intelligence for the British Army of the Rhine in February 1954, Chief of Staff for Middle East Land Forces in June 1957 and Director of Military Intelligence in August 1959 before retiring in June 1962.
 
He was appointed a Commander of the Order of the British Empire in the 1957 Birthday Honours and a Companion of the Order of the Bath in the 1959 Birthday Honours.

Personal life 
Lloyd married Gill Patterson, daughter of Rear-Admiral Julian Patterson, in September 1939. They lived in Germany, Cyprus and London before retiring to Lymington, Hampshire.

References

1906 births
1991 deaths
British Army major generals
Companions of the Order of the Bath
Companions of the Distinguished Service Order
Commanders of the Order of the British Empire
British Army personnel of World War II
Military personnel of British India